The Anglican Diocese of Quebec was founded by Letters Patent in 1793 and is a part of the Ecclesiastical Province of Canada of the Anglican Church of Canada, in turn a province of the Anglican Communion. In 1842, her jurisdiction was described as "Canada East" or "Lower Canada" (technically an historical term in 1842). The diocese comprises 720,000 square kilometres and took its present shape in 1850 with the carving off of what is now the Diocese of Montreal. It includes a territory of west to east from Magog to the Gaspe and the Magdalen Islands, south to north from the United States border to Kawawachikamach and several communities along the Lower North Shore.

The diocesan office is located in Quebec City, as is Holy Trinity Anglican Cathedral, completed in 1804. The diocese counts approximately 3,000 Anglican faithful who gather in 73 congregations as of 2017.

With both the dioceses of Quebec and Montreal having fewer than 10,000 members and decreasing numbers, discussions are underway to explore ways the two dioceses can work more closely together.

Bishops of Quebec

Deans of Quebec
The Dean of Quebec is also Rector of Holy Trinity Cathedral.

1888–1899: Richard W. Norman
1899–1915: Lennox W. Williams
1915–1925: Richmond Shreve
1925–1927: Louis R. Sherman (afterwards Bishop of Calgary, 1927)
1927–1947: Alfred Henchman Crowfoot
1948–1957: Robert L. Seaborn (afterwards Bishop of Newfoundland, 1965)
1957–1969: Arthur B. Coleman
1970–1977: Allen Goodings
1977–1987: J. Paul James
1989–1998: James D. Merrett
1999–2007: Walter H. Raymond OGS
2008–present: Christian Schreiner

History

M. E. Reisner, Strangers and Pilgrims: A History of the Anglican Diocese of Quebec, 1793-1993 (1995, Anglican Book Centre)  
Ernest Hawkins, Annals of the Diocese of Quebec

References

External links
 Diocese of Quebec website

Quebec, Anglican Diocese of
Christianity in Quebec
Organizations based in Quebec City
Anglican Province of Canada